Until 1 January 2007 Lundtoft was a municipality (Danish, kommune) in South Jutland County on the east coast of the Jutland peninsula in south Denmark.  The municipality covered an area of 137 km2, and had a total population of 6,184 (2005).  Its last mayor was Hans Philip Tietje, a member of the Venstre (Liberal Party) political party. The main town and the site of its municipal council was the town of Aabenraa, which it shared with neighboring Aabenraa Municipality.

 Felsted Parish
 Kliplev Parish
 Varnæs Parish

Lundtoft municipality ceased to exist as the result of Kommunalreformen ("The Municipality Reform" of 2007).  It was merged with Bov, Rødekro, Tinglev, and Aabenraa municipalities to form the new Aabenraa municipality.   This created a municipality with an area of 951 km2 and a total population of 60,151 (2005).  The new municipality belongs to Region of Southern Denmark.

External links 
 Aabenraa municipality's official website (Danish only)

References 
 Municipal statistics: NetBorger Kommunefakta, delivered from KMD aka Kommunedata (Municipal Data)
 Municipal mergers and neighbors: Eniro new municipalities map

Former municipalities of Denmark